Sinjeong-dong, Mapo District, Seoul
 Sinjeong-dong, Yangcheon District, Seoul
 Sinjeong-dong, Nam District, Ulsan
 Sinjeong-dong, Jeongeup, North Jeolla Province
 Sinjeong-dong, Namwon,  North Jeolla Province
 Sinjeong-dong, the former name of Onyang 4-dong, Asan, South Chungcheong Province